Springthorpe is a village and civil parish in the West Lindsey district of Lincolnshire, England. The population of the civil parish at the 2011 census was 138.

Springthorpe is listed in Domesday Book as "Springetorp", consisting of 21 households and a church.

The limestone parish church, which is dedicated to Saint Lawrence and Saint George, is a Grade I listed building dating from the 11th century, and restored in 1865. The font is 13th-century.

The deserted medieval village of "Sturgate" or "Stourgate" was in the parish, and was documented from the end of the 12th century.

References

External links

Springthorpe Village web site

Villages in Lincolnshire
Civil parishes in Lincolnshire
West Lindsey District